The 1966 New Mexico Lobos football team was an American football team that represented the University of New Mexico in the Western Athletic Conference (WAC) during the 1966 NCAA University Division football season.  In their seventh season under head coach Bill Weeks, the Lobos compiled a 2–8 record (0–5 against WAC opponents) and were outscored, 320 to 101.

Wally Seis and Albert O'Neal were the team captains. The team's statistical leaders included Rick Beitler with 763 passing yards, Carl Jackson with 348 rushing yards, Emilio Vallez with 373 receiving yards, and Carl Bradford with 24 points scored.

Schedule

References

New Mexico
New Mexico Lobos football seasons
New Mexico Lobos football